Aperioptus is a genus of loach only found in Southeast Asia.

Species
There are currently 6 recognized species in this genus:
 Aperioptus delphax (Siebert, 1991)
 Aperioptus gracilentus (H. M. Smith, 1945)
 Aperioptus gracilis (Fowler, 1934)
 Aperioptus hapalias (Siebert, 1991)
 Aperioptus pictorius J. Richardson, 1848
 Aperioptus robertsi (Siebert, 1991)

References

Cobitidae